"You Win Again" is a song written and recorded by American country music singer Mary Chapin Carpenter. It was released in October 1990 as the first single from the album Shooting Straight in the Dark. The song reached number 16 on the Billboard Hot Country Singles & Tracks chart and number 6 on the RPM Country Tracks in Canada.

Music video
The music video was directed by Bill Pope and premiered in early 1991.

Chart performance

Year-end charts

References

1991 singles
Mary Chapin Carpenter songs
Songs written by Mary Chapin Carpenter
Columbia Records singles
1990 songs